Frank Chermak was a member of the Wisconsin State Assembly.

Biography
Chermak was born on September 20, 1893 in Austria-Hungary. He later moved to Cudahy, Wisconsin.

Career
Chermak was elected to the Assembly in 1932. He was a Democrat.

References

Austro-Hungarian emigrants to the United States
People from Cudahy, Wisconsin
Democratic Party members of the Wisconsin State Assembly
1893 births
Year of death missing